The Law Enforcement National Data Exchange (N-DEx) brings together data from criminal justice agencies throughout the United States, including incident and case reports, booking and incarceration data, and parole/probation information. N-DEx detects relationships between people, vehicles/property, location, and/or crime characteristics. N-DEx is housed at the FBI's Criminal Justice Information Services Division in West Virginia.

Awards 
 GCN Awards 2009 Government Computer News Agency Award
 Christopher Columbus Fellowship Foundation 2010 Award for Information Sharing

References

External links
 N-DEx Program site
 FBI CJIS Division site

Federal Bureau of Investigation
Law enforcement in the United States
United States intelligence agencies
Law enforcement databases in the United States